Le Bleymard is a former commune in the Lozère department in southern France. On 1 January 2017, it was merged into the new commune Mont Lozère et Goulet.

The Scottish author Robert Louis Stevenson ate in the village on the evening of 28 September 1878 before camping nearby, as recounted in his book Travels with a Donkey in the Cévennes. The Robert Louis Stevenson Trail (GR 70), a popular long-distance path following Stevenson's approximate route, runs through the village, and a three-day "Festival Stevenson" is held in the area annually. The nearby Mont Lozère is a ski resort.

Population

Personalities
 Alphonse Magnien (1837–1902), Catholic educator
 Henri Rouvière (1876–1952), Professor of anatomy

See also
Communes of the Lozère department

References

External links

Le Bleymard in Lozere (separate texts in French, Dutch and German; photographs)

Former communes of Lozère